The Ambassador of the Organisation of Eastern Caribbean States to the European Union is the official representative of the governments of the Organisation of Eastern Caribbean States to the governments of the European Union.

List of representatives

Foreign relations of Saint Lucia
Foreign relations of the European Union

References 

Foreign missions of the Organisation of Eastern Caribbean States
Organisation of Eastern Caribbean States
.